Ken Remi Stefan Strandberg (born 25 July 1990) is a Norwegian professional footballer who plays as a defender for Eliteserien club Vålerenga and the Norway national team.

Hailing from Lyngdal, Strandberg started his senior career for Mandalskameratene before he moved to Vålerenga in 2009. After three seasons with the Oslo-based club, he joined Rosenborg ahead of the 2012 season.

Strandberg has represented Norway from under-15 to senior level, and was the captain of the under-21 team that got a bronze medal in the 2013 UEFA European Under-21 Football Championship.  He was also picked for team of the tournament, with the likes of; David de Gea, Alberto Moreno, Marc Bartra, Asier Illarramendi, Isco, Koke, Thiago Alcântara, Marco Verratti, Álvaro Morata, Fabio Borini and Luuk de Jong.

Club career
Strandberg was born in Lyngdal and played for Lyngdal IL until he moved to Mandalskameratene in 2006 where he made his debut for the senior team at the age of 15. He played three seasons for Mandalskameratene, and made eight appearances in the First Division when the club had a spell in the second-tier league in 2007.

Strandberg signed a four-year contract with the Tippeligaen side Vålerenga in January 2009. He was loaned out to Bryne FK in July 2009, as a replacement for the injured Christian Gauseth. Strandberg played four matches for the First Division side during the summer, before he returned to Vålerenga. He made his Tippeligaen-debut on 12 September 2009 when he replaced Mohammed Fellah 11 minutes before full-time in the match against Fredrikstad. He has previously had trials with clubs such as; Derby, Portsmouth and VfB Stuttgart. Vålerenga sold Strandberg, who had one year left of his contract, to their rivals Rosenborg ahead of the 2012 season.

On 26 August 2016, he joined Hannover 96 on loan from FC Krasnodar for the rest of the 2016–17 season.

On 17 January 2019, he joined another Russian club FC Ural Yekaterinburg on loan until the end of the 2018–19 season.

On 13 December 2019, he joined Italian Serie B club Trapani until the end of the 2019–20 season.

On 1 September 2020, he returned to Ural Yekaterinburg. He left Ural on 8 June 2021 as his contract expired.

On 23 July 2021, he signed a one-year contract with Italian club Salernitana. If certain performance conditions were met, the contract would be automatically renewed for another year.

International career
Strandberg first represented his country at under-15 level, where he played two matches in 2005. The following year, he played three matches for the under-16 team. He scored one goal in the matches for the under-18 team in 2008, before he played four matches for the under-19 team the next year. He made his debut for the under-21 team when he replaced Harmeet Singh after 78 minutes in the match against Hungary U21 on 28 May 2010. He later became a regular on the under-21 team, and was the captain of the team that qualified for the 2013 UEFA European Under-21 Football Championship.

Strandberg was called up for the Norwegian squad for the 2012 King's Cup, but had to withdraw due to an injury and was replaced by Thomas Drage. Strandberg was also called up for senior squad for the friendly matches against South Africa and Zambia in January 2013, but had to withdraw from the squad due to a surgery in the hip.

Career statistics

Club

International

Scores and results list Norway's goal tally first, score column indicates score after each Strandberg goal.

Honours
Individual
 UEFA U-21 Championship Team of the Tournament: 2013

References

External links

 Profile at VIF-Fotball.no

1990 births
Living people
People from Lyngdal
Norwegian footballers
Association football defenders
Norway international footballers
Norway youth international footballers
Norway under-21 international footballers
Norwegian First Division players
Eliteserien players
Russian Premier League players
2. Bundesliga players
Serie A players
Serie B players
Mandalskameratene players
Vålerenga Fotball players
Bryne FK players
Rosenborg BK players
FC Krasnodar players
Hannover 96 players
FC Ural Yekaterinburg players
Trapani Calcio players
U.S. Salernitana 1919 players
Norwegian expatriate footballers
Norwegian expatriate sportspeople in Russia
Expatriate footballers in Russia
Norwegian expatriate sportspeople in Germany
Expatriate footballers in Germany
Norwegian expatriate sportspeople in Italy
Expatriate footballers in Italy
FC Krasnodar-2 players
Sportspeople from Agder